Luis Aranguren (born 3 November 1930) is a Venezuelan boxer. He competed in the men's featherweight event at the 1952 Summer Olympics.

References

External links

1930 births
Possibly living people
Venezuelan male boxers
Olympic boxers of Venezuela
Boxers at the 1952 Summer Olympics
Place of birth missing (living people)
Featherweight boxers